Agyneta gracilipes is a species of sheet weaver found in Cameroon, Gabon, Congo, Kenya and Angola. It was described by Holm in 1968.

References

gracilipes
Arthropods of Kenya
Arthropods of Cameroon
Spiders of Africa
Spiders described in 1968